Alla Aleksandrovna Jakovleva (Алла Александровна Яковлева, also written as Alla Jakowlewa and Alla Yakovleva, born 12 July 1963) in Porkhov, Pskov Oblast, Soviet Union, is a retired Soviet Union female road cyclist. After finishing third in the women's road race at the 1986 UCI Road World Championships she became world champion in the women's team time trial in 1987 and finished second in the women's team time trial in 1988. Jakovleva competed at the 1988 Summer Olympics in the women's road race and finished 34th.

References

External links

1963 births
Living people
Soviet female cyclists
UCI Road World Champions (women)
Olympic cyclists of the Soviet Union
Cyclists at the 1988 Summer Olympics